Fernando Nélson Jesus Vieira Alves (born 5 November 1971), known as Nélson, is a Portuguese retired footballer who played as a right back.

Best known for his spell at Sporting, he also played for Porto in his country, having a two-year stint at Aston Villa in England as well.

Over the course of ten seasons, Nélson amassed Primeira Liga totals of 202 games and three goals.

Football career
Nélson was born in Porto. After starting professionally at local S.C. Salgueiros, he moved to fellow Primeira Liga club Sporting Clube de Portugal immediately after having helped the Portugal under-20s win the 1991 FIFA World Youth Championship, played in the country.

At the Lisbon-based side, Nélson won the 1995 Taça de Portugal. After producing three final solid seasons, where he amassed nearly 100 league appearances and scored two goals, he joined Aston Villa in the 1996 summer, under manager Brian Little.

After two productive Premier League campaigns in the Midlands and 75 games across all competitions, in July 1998 Nélson signed with FC Porto – his first youth club – winning his first national championship in his debut season. He would be used irregularly during the following three years (playing as much as 20 matches and as little as none), and moved in 2002 to Vitória F.C. also in the top division.

Nélson retired after two seasons with amateurs S.C. Rio Tinto, later becoming its president.

Personal life
Nélson's twin brother, Albertino, was also a footballer and a defender. He too started his career – which spanned more than two decades, with teams in all levels of Portuguese football – with Porto (youth) and Salgueiros, and amassed top division totals of 204 games and one goal, mainly with C.S. Marítimo (seven seasons, 169/1).

Nélson was a member of Opus Dei.

Honours

Club
Sporting
Taça de Portugal: 1994–95
Supertaça Cândido de Oliveira: 1995

Porto
Primeira Liga: 1998–99
Taça de Portugal: 1999–2000, 2000–01

International
Portugal U-20
FIFA U-20 World Cup: 1991

References

External links

1971 births
Living people
Portuguese twins
Footballers from Porto
Twin sportspeople
Portuguese footballers
Association football defenders
Primeira Liga players
Segunda Divisão players
S.C. Salgueiros players
Sporting CP footballers
FC Porto players
FC Porto B players
Vitória F.C. players
Premier League players
Aston Villa F.C. players
Portugal youth international footballers
Portugal under-21 international footballers
Portugal international footballers
Portuguese expatriate footballers
Expatriate footballers in England
Portuguese expatriate sportspeople in England